Szerzawy  is a village in the administrative district of Gmina Mogilno, within Mogilno County, Kuyavian-Pomeranian Voivodeship, in north-central Poland.

The village has a population of 36 women and 38 men amounting to 74 people all together.

References

Szerzawy